Kishan Lal Rajpoot is an Indian politician in the Indian state of Uttar Pradesh.

Political career
He represents the Barkhera constituency of Uttar Pradesh and is a member of the Bharatiya Janata Party. Since 2017, he has represented the Barkhera constituency.

Posts held

See also
Uttar Pradesh Legislative Assembly

References

Uttar Pradesh MLAs 2017–2022
Bharatiya Janata Party politicians from Uttar Pradesh
Living people
Year of birth missing (living people)